Caniapiscau is a vast unorganized territory in the Côte-Nord region of Quebec, Canada, part of Caniapiscau Regional County Municipality.

The territory is home to the huge Caniapiscau Reservoir, the largest body of water in Quebec and the second-largest reservoir in Canada. The reservoir was named after Lake Caniapiscau that was flooded in 1981 during the formation of the reservoir. The name comes from the Cree or Innu term kaniapiskau or kaneapiskak which means "rocky point" or "place where there is a rocky point". Albert Peter Low had noted in 1895 that "a high rocky headland jutts into the lake." He probably referred to the northwest facing peninsula that gives the reservoir the shape of an arc as we know it now.

In the 19th century, Lake Caniapiscau was frequented by hunters and fur traders. In 1834, the Hudson's Bay Company opened there an outpost to link its facilities in the James Bay region with those of Ungava Bay. The Kaniapiskau Post closed in 1870.

Community

Caniapiscau is a small community without a permanent population, just north of the Caniapiscau Reservoir. It was formed as a temporary worksite in 1974 for workers involved in the construction of the dams and floodgates of this reservoir. The reservoir was built as part of the James Bay Project that gave rise to the La Grande hydroelectric complex. The worksite was closed after construction ended towards 1984.

The  between Caniapiscau and Brisay is only recommended for four-wheel drive vehicles due to large rocks on the coarse-gravel surface.

The site is now used by an outfitter (fishing and caribou hunting) and the commercial Lac Pau Seaplane Base allows floatplanes to launch, subject to seasonal conditions.

Demographics
Population trend:
 Population in 2011: 0
 Population in 2006: 0
 Population in 2001: 0
 Population in 1996: 0
 Population in 1991: 0

Transport
Caniapiscau is accessible by car via the Trans-Taiga Road. Located approximately 75 km south of Radisson, the Trans-Taiga highway is an unpaved gravel road. Along the road there are several campgrounds where users are able to spend the night. Donations are accepted, but not required. There are also several outfitters located along the way. Some are only open during certain times of the year, however Pourvoirie Mirage is open all year round at km 358. Food and gas may be purchased at this location. Caniapiscau Aerodrome is located in this region.

References

External links
Caniapiscau (Hydro-Québec)
Caniapiscau Reservoir

Unorganized territories in Côte-Nord
Communities in Côte-Nord
Hudson's Bay Company trading posts
James Bay Project